In mathematics, Kodaira's classification is either

 The Enriques–Kodaira classification, a classification of complex surfaces, or
 Kodaira's classification of singular fibers, which classifies the possible fibers of an elliptic fibration.